Wythenshawe bus station serves the Wythenshawe area of Greater Manchester, England.

The bus station was opened by the Greater Manchester Passenger Transport Executive in 1981. It is mainly served by operators Stagecoach Manchester and Arriva North West. Most buses that call here also provide links to Manchester Airport.

Wythenshawe Bus Station can be divided into two parts. The Main Station (stands A-H) conveys all Wythenshawe services and the Forum (stands K, L, M and N) conveys some but not all.

In conjunction with the opening of the Manchester Metrolink Airport Line, the station was rebuilt in 2015.

Services
There are several companies that use Wythenshawe bus station. The majority of services are run by Stagecoach Manchester with the remainder of services run by Arriva North West, Diamond Bus North West and Manchester Community Transport.

There are frequent buses running to Altrincham, Manchester, Manchester Airport, Stockport and Wythenshawe Hospital plus several parts of the Manchester and Trafford areas including Cheadle, Gatley, the Trafford Centre, Northenden, Sale, Stretford and Urmston.

References

External links

Bus stations in Greater Manchester
1981 establishments in England